Live n Livin is the seventh studio album by Jamaican dancehall singer Sean Paul, released on 12 March 2021 by his label Dutty Rock Productions. Recorded in Jamaica in various studios, It features collaborations with Assassin, Bugle, Buju Banton, Busy Signal, Chi Ching Ching, Damian Marley, Govana, Intence, Jesse Royal, Leftside, Looga Man, Masicka, Mavado, Mutabaruka, Ras Ajai, Serani, Skillibeng, Sotto Bless, Squash, Stonebwoy, and Suku Ward 21.

Live N Livin debuted at number 9 on the US Billboard Reggae Albums with 1,000 album equivalent units. The album would also receive a Grammy nomination for Best Reggae Album at the 64th Annual Grammy Awards.

Singles 

 The first single of the album "Buss a Bubble (Official Solo version)" was released on 12 September 2019. Its official music video was released on 25 October 2019. The album version is a remix featuring Chi Ching Ching, Ras Ajai, Looga Man & Sotto Bless.
 "Lion Heart" was released as a single in on 20 October 2020.
 The third single "Guns of Navarone" which features Jesse Royal and Mutabaruka was released on 18 December 2020. The album version is featuring Stonebwoy.
 "Real Streel" featuring Intence was released on 19 February 2021.

Track listing

Charts

References 

2021 albums
Sean Paul albums